Ruth Godfrey was a World Series of Poker champion in the 1981 $400 Ladies - Limit 7 Card Stud event.

As of 2008, her total WSOP tournament winnings exceed $19,150.

Godfrey won the $400 Ladies Seven Card Stud event at the 1981 Super Bowl of Poker.

World Series of Poker Bracelet

References

American poker players
Female poker players
World Series of Poker bracelet winners
Super Bowl of Poker event winners
Year of birth missing (living people)
Living people